Bososo is a town in Eastern Region, southern Ghana.

Transport 

It is served by a station on the eastern mainline of the national rail network.

See also 
 Railway stations in Ghana

References 

Populated places in the Eastern Region (Ghana)